Chinggis usually refers to Genghis Khan, the founder of the Mongol Empire.

Chinggis may also refer to:

Chinggis (vodka), an alcohol brand from Mongolia
Chinggis City, new name of the city of Öndörkhaan
Chinggis Square, new name of Sükhbaatar Square
Chinggis Khaan International Airport, former name of Buyant-Ukhaa International Airport

See also
 Genghis (disambiguation)
 Genghis Khan (disambiguation)
 Temujin (disambiguation)

Chinggisids, Asian dynasties descended from Genghis Khan